Ariosoma meeki is an eel in the family Congridae (conger/garden eels). It was described by David Starr Jordan and John Otterbein Snyder in 1900, originally under the genus Congrellus. It is a subtropical, marine eel which is known from Japan and the Peng-hu Islands, in the northwestern Pacific Ocean. Males are known to reach a maximum total length of 53 centimetres.

Named in honor of ichthyologist Seth Eugene Meek (1859-1914), who first recognized the distinctiveness of this species.

References

meeki
Taxa named by David Starr Jordan
Taxa named by John Otterbein Snyder 
Fish described in 1900